Max is the sixth studio album by German recording artist Max Mutzke. It was released by Columbia Records and Sony Music on 12 June 2015 in German-speaking Europe.

Track listing

Charts

Release history

References

External links
MaxMutzke.de — Official website

2015 albums
Max Mutzke albums